Placostylus porphyrostomus is a species of large air-breathing land snail, a pulmonate gastropod mollusk in the family Bothriembryontidae. 

Subspecies
 Placostylus porphyrostomus mariei (Crosse & P. Fischer, 1867)
 Placostylus porphyrostomus monackensis (Crosse, 1888)
 Placostylus porphyrostomus porphyrostomus (L. Pfeiffer, 1853)
 Placostylus porphyrostomus smithii Kobelt, 1891

Distribution
This species is endemic to New Caledonia.

References

 Neubert, E., Chérel-Mora C. & Bouchet P. (2009). Polytypy, clines, and fragmentation: The bulimes of New Caledonia revisited (Pulmonata, Orthalicoidea, Placostylidae). In P. Grancolas (ed.), Zoologia Neocaledonica 7. Biodiversity studies in New Caledonia. Mémoires du Muséum National d'Histoire Naturelle. 198: 37-131

External links
 Pfeiffer, L. (1853). Description of fifty-four new species of Helicea, from the collection of Hugh Cuming, Esq. Proceedings of the Zoological Society of London. 19: 252-256 [16 July 1853; 257-263]

porphyrostomus
Endemic fauna of New Caledonia
Gastropods described in 1851